The Kaman K-16B was an experimental vertical-takeoff-and-landing aircraft that was constructed by Kaman Aircraft for the United States Navy in 1959 to evaluate the tiltwing concept. Converted from a Grumman Goose amphibian, the K-16B underwent extensive wind tunnel and tethered testing, but was not flown before the project was terminated in 1962.

Design and development
During the late 1950s, there was extensive interest in the vertical takeoff and landing concept for aircraft, with multiple experimental types ordered to develop the technology for potential service. The United States Navy contracted with Kaman Aircraft of Bloomfield, Connecticut, to build a testbed based on the company's 'rotorprop' concept for tiltwing aircraft, using a Grumman JRF-5 Goose amphibian and other existing parts to reduce the cost and time necessary. The fuselage and tail of the Goose were mated to a new tilting wing and engine configuration; the maximum angle of incidence allowed was only 50 degrees; the rotorprop was expected to provide sufficient thrust to allow VTOL operations despite the low angle.

Operational history
Delivered in late 1959, the K-16B underwent extensive wind tunnel testing, along with some tethered hops, to evaluate the tiltwing configuration's aerodynamic characteristics. Flight testing was originally anticipated to begin in the fall of 1960, however these preliminary tests continued into 1962. That year the project was cancelled with the aircraft having not conducted its first free flight.

Surviving aircraft
The prototype K-16B is on display at the New England Air Museum in Windsor Locks, Connecticut.

Specifications

See also

References
Citations

Bibliography

External links

K-016B
1950s United States experimental aircraft
Tiltwing aircraft
High-wing aircraft
Turboshaft-powered aircraft
Twin-turboprop tractor aircraft